Joseph Campbell Butler (born September 16, 1941) is an American drummer and stage actor. He was a founding member of The Lovin' Spoonful, who had seven top 10 hits between 1965 and 1966.

Early life 
Joe Butler was born on September 16, 1941, in Long Island, New York. He began playing drums at age 10 and started playing professionally at 13. Butler was in the Air Force until 1963. While in the air force, he met Steve Boone and his brother Skip.

Career

Music 
He was a principal member of the pop rock band The Lovin' Spoonful, founded by John Sebastian and Zal Yanovsky in 1965. Drummer Jan Carl was replaced by Joe after their first gig at the Night Owl in Greenwich Village. Eventually, Steve Boone joined the group and they later signed with Kama Sutra Records. The Lovin' Spoonful's most well known hits are Do You Believe in Magic, Summer In The City and Darlin' Be Home Soon. Butler was given the lead vocals on the songs "You Baby", "Full Measure", Never Going Back", "Only Pretty, What A Pity" and "Me About You", while he was with the Spoonful. After Sebastian left the band, Butler became the lead vocalist for their last album, Revelation: Revolution '69. However, the album was a complete flop – most likely because of the absence of Sebastian – which lead to the band's dissolution only months later.

Joe was inducted into the Rock and Roll Hall of Fame as a member of the Lovin' Spoonful in 2000 and performed with the original line-up for the last time. Since its reforming in 1991, Joe has continued to perform with founding member Steve Boone in The Lovin' Spoonful, and has retained his position as lead vocalist. He also plays the guitar, autoharp and percussion instruments.

Acting 
He also was in the 1971 rock opera Soon. Butler currently plays with several musical ensembles. He replaced the author James Rado, in the leading role of Claude, joining the original Broadway cast of Hair. Butler created the role of Alaska Wolf Joe for the off-Broadway production of the Brecht-Weill social opera The Rise and Fall of Mahogonny. Butler is a founding member of the Circle Theatre Company. Alongside award-winning and renowned director Marshall W. Mason and Pulitzer prize winning playwright Lanford Wilson, Joe has wrote and directed numerous projects.

Personal life 
Butler was married to Leslie Vega on 9/2/67.  He is currently married to Kim Ablondi. His daughter from his first marriage is actress Yancy Butler, star of TV series' Mann and Machine and South Beach and films Hard Target and Drop Zone. He currently resides in Greenwich Village.

References

External links
 Joe Butler at lovinspoonful.com

1941 births
Living people
People from Long Island
American rock drummers
American folk singers
American male singers
Songwriters from New York (state)
American autoharp players
The Lovin' Spoonful members
20th-century American drummers
American male drummers